In fiction, a false protagonist is a literary technique, often used to make the plot more jarring or more memorable by fooling the audience's preconceptions, that constructs a character who the audience assumes is the protagonist but is later revealed not to be.

A false protagonist is presented at the start of the fictional work as the main character, but then is eradicated, often by killing them (usually for shock value or as a plot twist) or changed in terms of their role in the story (i.e. making them a lesser character, a character who leaves the story, or revealing them to actually be the antagonist).

Overview
In film, a character can be made to seem like the main protagonist based on a number of techniques (beyond just simply focusing the plot on their role). Star power is a very effective method; audience members generally assume that the biggest "name" in a film will have a significant part to play. An abundance of close-ups can also be used as a subliminal method. Generally, the star of a film will get longer-lasting and more frequent close-ups than any other character, but this is rarely immediately apparent to viewers during the film. Alternatively, the false protagonist can serve as a narrator to the film, encouraging the audience to assume that the character survives to tell their tale later.

Many of the same techniques used in film can also apply to television, but the episodic nature adds an additional possibility. By ending one or more episodes with the false protagonist still in place, the show can reinforce the viewers' belief in the character's protagonist status. Also, because TV shows often have changes of cast between seasons, some series can have unintentional false protagonists: characters who begin the series as the main character but then are replaced early in the show's run by another character entirely. When the series is viewed as a whole, this can lead to the appearance of a false protagonist.

In video games, a false protagonist may initially be a playable character, only to be killed or revealed to be the antagonist. One key way in which video games employ the method that differs from uses in non-interactive fiction is by granting the player direct control over the false protagonist. Since most video games allow a player to control only the main characters (and their success or failure is based on playing skill, not pre-determined story), the sudden demise of the character that is being controlled serves to surprise the player.

Examples

Literature
The Book of Samuel begins with Samuel's birth and God's call to him as a boy. At this point, the readers are led to believe that Samuel is the central figure in the book. Though by the sixteenth chapter, the book starts to primarily focus on David.
 The well-known story of Aladdin in the Arabian Nights begins with a wizard undertaking a difficult quest all the way from Morocco to China to recover a powerful magical lamp. Only gradually does it become clear that the boy Aladdin, whom the Wizard meets in China, is the true protagonist, and the wizard turns out to actually be the story's villain. 
George R. R. Martin's novel A Game of Thrones, the first entry in the A Song of Ice and Fire epic fantasy series, features chapters told from the point of view of numerous characters, though the most prominent is Ned Stark. In the television adaptation Game of Thrones he was portrayed by Sean Bean, who received top billing among the cast for Season One. Stark is generally assumed to be the series' main protagonist until the final chapters of the novel (corresponding to the penultimate episode of the first season) where he is unexpectedly executed.
The light novel Goblin Slayer introduces a Warrior, Mage, and Monk who recruit a Priestess for a goblin killing quest. The three are eaten, poisoned to death, and sexually assaulted to the point of ending up in a vegetative state. The Priestess is rescued by the legendary Goblin Slayer who replaces her escorts as the protagonist. The escorts were featured in promotional marketing material for the novel and its anime adaptation until the first episode was released.
Japanese manga Solanin shows the existential struggles of Taneda and his girlfriend Meiko sharing an apartment in Tokyo after graduating university. The story focuses heavily on Taneda as lead vocalist of the band Rotti and how he puts everything on the line for his music career. A big record label shows interest but offers to trade out Taneda's singer/songwriting for that of an upcoming idol. The deal is rejected. Defeated, Taneda disappears only to finally announce his return days later. After hanging up the phone, he dies in a traffic accident. The story continues with the heartbroken Meiko picking up his guitar and practicing vigorously to perform his song "Solanin" in front of a live audience.
In the novel Villette by Charlotte Brontë, the narrator makes readers think in the first few chapters the main character is Paulina Home, however, it is discovered later that the narrator, Lucy Snowe is actually the main character after Paulina disappears for a while in the plot.

Film
 Alfred Hitchcock's film Psycho opens with Marion Crane as the main character.  However, she is killed partway through the film, making the murder far more unexpected and shocking. Hitchcock felt that the opening scenes with Marion as the false protagonist were so important to the film that when it was released in theaters, he compelled theater owners to enforce a "no late admission" policy.
 In A Nightmare on Elm Street, the character of Tina Gray is the false protagonist of the film. She is depicted as being plagued by nightmares from the main villain, Freddy Krueger, and her troubled home life is depicted in great detail. Despite this, she is then killed fifteen minutes into the 90-minute film, allowing her best friend Nancy Thompson to become evident as the true protagonist.
 Later, there was the example of Kristen Parker from A Nightmare on Elm Street 3: Dream Warriors. After Patricia Arquette's refusal to revisit the horror genre, Arquette was replaced with Tuesday Knight. Knight's version became a small role, where Kristen was killed off, and her close friend at school, Alice Johnson became the new lead for the fourth film and its sequel.
 In the action film Executive Decision, the character played by Steven Seagal is introduced as a major protagonist only to be killed at the end of the first act, leaving the character played by Kurt Russell as the film's true hero.
 Jamie Lee Curtis as Laurie Strode is the false protagonist of Halloween: Resurrection after the ending of Halloween H20 was retconned to suggest Michael swapped places with a paramedic. Fans expressed displeasure and outrage at this event, as Strode is killed in the opening scene, but the events that follow are completely unrelated.
 Similarly, Jamie Lloyd is the false protagonist of Halloween: The Curse of Michael Myers after starring as the protagonist of the fourth and fifth films as Laurie's daughter. This also earned backlash due to Jamie Lloyd's recasting and the disturbing incest story added, after audiences were previously aware of the character as a child as well.
 The film The Place Beyond the Pines can be seen as having two different false protagonists. The first one, Luke Glanton, is depicted as the protagonist for the first third of the film, going through a general three-act structure. However, he is killed by the character Avery Cross, who had not previously appeared and assumes the role of protagonist for the next third. After a similar act structure for Avery, a time skip occurs, during which Avery becomes a supporting character and the role of protagonist is assumed by Luke's son, Jason Kancam, for the remainder of the film.
 Sidney Prescott herself can be considered a false protagonist for the fifth movie of Scream. The promotional cycle of the fifth film, a soft reboot simply titled Scream showcases Sidney front and centre on the poster, and she was promoted as the main draw-in for audiences to watch the film. Despite this, it is Sam Carpenter, portrayed by Melissa Barrera—the illegitimate daughter of original Ghostface mastermind, Billy Loomis—who serves as the true successor heroine in the film.
In Mindhunters, J.D. (Christian Slater) was one of the central characters in the film's opening, alongside Sara (Kathryn Morris). However, J.D (Slater) was killed half hour into the film, and was the first character to be killed off. Val Kilmer's character Jack Harris was also ubiquitous at the beginning of the film, who was a leader. His character abruptly goes offscreen, until the other characters learn that he was killed.
Tim Burton's Mars Attacks! had a series of notable actors who played false protagonists. They all either end up dying or being captured by the aliens. The actors who played false protagonists include Jack Nicholson, Pierce Brosnan and Michael J. Fox. The characters who survived were played by actors who were less known at that time (Natalie Portman, for one).
In Arachnophobia, nature photographer Jerry Manley (Mark L. Taylor) is initially portrayed as the protagonist.  However, a few minutes into the film, he is bitten and killed by the venom of a poisonous spider, and the focus shifts to Dr. Ross Jennings (Jeff Daniels).
Perhaps the most famous false protagonists are C-3PO and R2-D2 from Star Wars. The film's opening sequence focuses on the two as they struggle to escape from the Tantive IV as it is overrun by Imperial stormtroopers. After they flee the ship on an escape pod to Tatooine, the film shifts its main focus to Luke Skywalker, the actual protagonist of the film.
In the Coen brothers film No Country for Old Men, Llewllyn Moss (Josh Brolin) appears to be the story's central character until he is killed offscreen midway in the movie and the narrative switches focus to the sheriff, played by Tommy Lee Jones.
In A Perfect Getaway, a mild-mannered couple (played by Steve Zahn and Milla Jovovich), who are the main protagonists, discover that there are psychopaths stalking and murdering tourists in the Hawaiian islands. The ending reveals that they are the actual killers.
In The Ring, Samara (Daveigh Chase) is introduced as a tragic protagonist during flashbacks where viewers are meant to sympathize with her, only for the movie's ending to reveal that she is a maleficent entity.

 The 2020 film The Hunt introduces a string of false protagonists beginning with Emma Roberts, and continuing through Justin Hartley and Ike Barinholtz, before revealing Betty Gilpin's character Crystal to be the true protagonist.

 The 1990 film Hidden Agenda starts with American Lawyer Paul Sullivan (Brad Dourif) in Belfast, Northern Ireland being handed a tape recording by an Ex-British Army intelligence officer, Harris, which leads to Paul to investigate its contents. He is later killed by RUC Special Branch agents in a drive-by shooting in the Northern Ireland countyside. This shooting brings international attention, which brings the true protagonist, Ingred Jessner (Frances McDormand) Paul's girlfriend, and British police detective Kerrigan (Brian Cox) to follow up on Paul's investigation and seek out Captain Harris and other involved parties to bring justice to Paul Sullivan's murder.

Video games 
 In Metal Gear Solid 2: Sons of Liberty the player initially controls Solid Snake, protagonist of the original Metal Gear games. After his fate is left unknown, the game makes the player assume control to Raiden for the remainder of the game while Snake is reduced to a minor role. The game's design document claimed Raiden was envisioned for female players to better empathize with him than they might have with Snake. Hideo Kojima, the game's writer and director, revealed one reason for introducing Raiden was that the frequent use of the in-game CODEC radio that provided the player with valuable information would have made less sense being used by the veteran soldier Snake. Kojima also wanted to introduce a story theme of identity and probe at Snake's popularity among gamers by portraying him as a legendary figure from other characters' perspectives, which required the player to no longer be in control of him.
 The Tekken fighting game series featured  as the protagonist of the original 1994 game who later became one of the major antagonists of the series for each following installment. He participates in the King of Iron Fist Tournament hosted by his abusive father , CEO of the worldwide conglomerate Mishima Zaibatsu. Replacing him as CEO, Kazuya becomes corrupt and engaged in more ruthless endeavors in his pursuit of power. Heihachi eventually regains control and they both remain antagonists in the series. , Kazuya's son and Tekken's true protagonist, describes their conflict as a cycle of abuse which he seeks to end.
 In Assassin's Creed III, the player controls the character Haytham Kenway for roughly the first third of the game as he travels to the American Colonies to find artifacts of the First Civilization and expand his organization's influence in the Colonies. At the end of his sequences, it is revealed that Haytham's organization is in fact the Templar Order, the series' overarching villains, and that Haytham is its Grand Master, thus making him the main antagonist of the game. The player's perspective is then switched to Haytham's illegitimate son, Ratonhnaké:ton, also known as Connor, the true protagonist, who becomes an Assassin and eventually encounters Haytham. Prior to Assassin's Creed IIIs release, Connor was advertised as the sole playable character of the game and Haytham was not even included in any of the marketing material, to make this twist more surprising for players.
 In Danganronpa V3: Killing Harmony, the player controls Kaede Akamatsu during the prologue and the first chapter of the game. In the finale of the first chapter, Kaede is revealed to have been the killer in the first murder case of the game, and is thus executed by Monokuma. From that point onward, the player controls another character, Shuichi Saihara. Prior to Danganronpa V3s release, Kaede was advertised as the sole playable character, and Shuichi was only promoted as one of the non-playable characters, to make this twist surprising for players.
 The Last of Us Part II lets the player control the antagonist Abby during her introduction in the prologue until she kills Joel for unknown reasons. Ellie seeks revenge and is controlled by the player through three in-game days until she encounters Abby again. Their encounter is paused, and the player begins controlling Abby in a flashback, playing the same three days from her perspective and learning her motivation for killing Joel. Upon reaching the point of her encounter with Ellie, the player fights her while in control of Abby. The player then alternates between both characters, culminating in a final battle against Abby while playing as Ellie. The goal of this decision, as stated by the game's creative director and lead co-writer Neil Druckmann, was to make the player hate Abby for murdering Joel, and later empathize with her for her vulnerabilities. Controlling Abby at the beginning of the game before it was clear she was the antagonist was meant to make it easier for the player to connect with her.

See also
Antihero
False hero
Plot twist
Red herring (narrative)

References

Counterparts to the protagonist
Heroes